The Cockney Alphabet is a recital of the English alphabet intended to parody the way the alphabet is taught to small working class children. The ostensible humour comes from forming unexpected words and phrases from the names of the various letters of the alphabet, mocking the way people from East London speak. Cockney is a name given to the working class of East London by the middle and upper classes.

Clapham and Dwyer version

In 1936, the comedy double act Clapham and Dwyer recorded the following version, entitled "A Surrealist Alphabet":

B for mutton (beef or mutton)
C for 'th highlanders (Seaforth Highlanders)
E for Adam (Eve or Adam)
G for police (chief of police)
H for respect (age for respect)
I for Novello (Ivor Novello)
J for oranges (Jaffa oranges)
L for leather (Hell for leather)
M for 'sis (emphasis)
O for the garden wall (over the garden wall)
P for a penny (pee for a penny)
Q for a song (cue for a song), or Q for billiards (cue for billiards) 
R for mo''' (half a mo')S for you (it's for you)T for two (tea for two)U for films (UFA films)V for La France (vive la France)W for a bob (double you for a bob?, as in gambling)X for breakfast (eggs for breakfast)Y for Gawd's sake (why, for God's sake?)Z for breezes (zephyr breezes, see West wind)

Alternative versions

(trouble you for a match?)W for a tenner (trouble you for a tenner?)Y for girlfriend (wife, or girlfriend?)Y for Heaven's sake (why, for Heaven's sake)Y for crying out loud (why, for crying out loud)Y for biscuit (wafer biscuit)Y for a husband (wife for a husband)Y for mistress (wife or mistress)Y for motherY for runts ('Y' fronts, underwear)Z for his hat (his head for his hat)Z for a joke (said for a joke)Z for Zodiac (Zephyr Zodiac Ford Zephyr)

Naming a dog "Deefer" (as was common in the '50s) is an example of the reverse of this phenomenon, based on interpreting the line D for dog'' in an everyday alphabet verse as "deefer dog". "Ceefer" as a name for a cat also appeared in Australia after the Second World War (C for cat) influenced by returning servicemen from England who had been exposed to the humour of the Cockney Alphabet.

Notes

Humour
English orthography
Spelling alphabets
English culture